Adored may refer to:

 The Adored, a band based in Los Angeles, California
 Adored (film), a 2003 LGBT-related drama film
 Adored (novel), a young adult novel by Cecily von Ziegesar
 "Adored", a song by Collective Soul from Afterwords, 2007
 "Adored", a song by Poppy, 2016